Temper Temper may refer to:

Temper Temper (duo), a British musical duo
Temper Temper (Temper Temper album), the duo's 1991 album
Temper Temper (Bullet for My Valentine album), 2013
"Temper Temper" (Bullet for My Valentine song)
"Temper Temper" (Goldie song), 1998
"Temper Temper" (Lime Cordiale song), 2017

See also

Temper (disambiguation)